Prayer Book was a series of military plans  operations in Panama drawn up beginning in April 1988 as relations between the United States and Panama deteriorated. The operation consisted of four separate operations: Klondike Key, Post Time, Blue Spoon, and Blind Logic. Originally, these operations were all parts of one operation named Elaborate Maze.
Prayer Book also included Operation Elder Statesman, Operation Krystal Ball, and Operation Purple Storm.

Blue Spoon
See Operation Blue Spoon/Just Cause

References

Military plans
1988 in Panama